Jeffrey Evans is a singer and songwriter best known for his Memphis, TN based bands '68 Comeback, The Gibsons Bros., South Filthy and his current solo career.
Evans' musical style combines elements of rockabilly, blues, garage rock, punk and rock'n'roll.

History

Name

 Stage name of musician Jeffrey Evans.
 Listed as Monsieur Jeffrey Evans on some recordings.

Cities

 Evans began his musical career in Columbus, Ohio in 1985.
 He moved to Memphis, Tennessee in 1989. Mehr

Musical background

Influences

He has cited influences such as:
 blues musician R. L. Burnside
 rockabilly singer Charlie Feathers Mehr
 Claude "Blues Boss" Long Mehr
 rock-n-roll pioneer Gene Vincent
 bluegrass flat-picker Doc Watson

He is considered an influence on bands such as:
 Los Raw Gospels
 the Touch-Me-Nots

Instruments

 His primary instrument is guitar; he plays acoustic guitar, electric guitar, and slide guitar.
 He plays banjo, Farfisa organ, and harmonica (blues harp).
 He is also well known for his vocals.

Style

Evans' musical genre has been described as:

 alternative rock
 blues-rock
garage punk
 garage rock revival
 gutter blues
 indie rock
 lo-fi
 psychobilly Mehr
 punk blues
 rockabilly
 roots rock
 trash Mehr

His on-stage antics include banter, story-telling, and tidbits of music history.

He has written expressive liner notes.

Recording and Producing

He utilizes his Tillman Audio Research studio for recording. Mehr

He has recorded and produced for artists such as:

 American Death Ray. Death Ray Breakdown. (Misprint Records) MSP 0070. Vinyl recording. (2000)
 Mr. Airplane Man. Red Lite. (Sympathy for the Record Industry) SFTRI 649. Vinyl recording. (2001) Mehr
 Monster Truck Five. "Dry Leaves... Hot Wire." (Sympathy for the Record Industry) SFTRI 438. Vinyl recording. (1996)
 Porch Ghouls. Porch Ghouls. (Orange Recordings) OR 013. Vinyl recording. (2001) Mehr
 Ron Franklin Entertainers. Feather Bed & Other Mixes Remix EP (Miz Kafrin) Miz Kafrin 201. Vinyl recording. (2002)
 Tav Falco & the Unapproachable Panther Burns. Panther Phobia. (In The Red) ITR 069. Vinyl recording. (2000)

Bands

Bands he has formed
 '68 Comeback Mehr
 Evans Hot Rod Gang Mehr
 Gibson Bros. Mehr
 Jeff Evans & His Southern Aces
 Jeffrey Evans' CC Riders Mehr
 Memphis Roadmasters
 Monsieur Jeffrey Evans & La Fong

Bands he has joined
 Adolescent Music Fantasy
 South Filthy Mehr

Songwriting

Songs he has written and recorded

 "'68"
 "Big Pine Boogie"
 "Chantilly Rock (And A Pony's Tail)"
 "Clean Young 16"
 "The Darker the Berry"
 "In the Company of Kings"
 "It Gets a Little Red"
 "King's Road"
 "Lil' Hand, Big Gun"
 "A Little Bitch (And a Little Bitch Better)"
 "The Long, Long Ballad of the Red-headed Girl"
 "The Man Who Loved Couch Dancing"
 "My Huckleberry Friend"
 "Polaroid Portrait"
 "Ran Out Of Run"
 "Rich Man, Rich Man"
 "Sandra Lynn's Blues"
 "The Searchers"
 "Someday My Prince Will Come"
 "Spyder Blues"
 "The String You Wear"
 "That's How My Mind Works"
 "Three Time Loser"
 "Tobacco Road, Part II"
 "You Walked in the Room"

Other artists who have recorded his songs

 Eugene Chadbourne Mehr
 James "Jimbo" Mathus Mehr
 Jack Yarber Mehr

Record Labels

 1+2 Records
 Bag Of Hammers
 Beast Records
 Caroline Records
 Casting Couch Records
 Contaminated Records
 db's Records
 Get Hip
 Giant Claw
 Glitterhouse Records
 Goner Records
 Homestead Records (Dutch East India Trading)
 In the Red Records
 Intercord
 Licorice Tree Records
 No.6 Records
 OKra Records
 Old Age Records
 PCP Entertainment (Matador Records)
 P-Vine Records
 Rockin' Bones
 Shangri-La Records
 Siltbreeze Records
 Sub Pop
 Sugar Ditch
 Sympathy for the Record Industry Mehr
 Undone Records
 Wrecked Em Records

Discography

Gibson Bros.

Singles

 Gibson Bros., Emulsified b/w Broke Down Engine. (Siltbreeze Records) SB 03. Vinyl recording. (1991)
 Gibson Bros., Keepers. (OKra Records) OK 45001/104553. Vinyl recording. (1986) Songs: My Young Life; Parchman Farm; Dirt.
 Gibson Bros., Knock Down My Blues b/w I'm Driftin.''' (In The Red) ITR 009. Vinyl recording. (1992)
 Gibson Bros., Mean Mistreater. (Homestead Records) HMS 170–7. Vinyl recording. (1992) Songs: Cat Drug In; Girl Can't Help It; Soul Deep.
 Gibson Bros., My Huckleberry Friend b/w Old Devil. (Giant Claw) GCS 002. Vinyl recording. (1991)
 Gibson Bros., Southbound. (Glitterhouse Records) GR 0152. Vinyl recording. (1991) Songs: Big Pine Boogie;  Arkansas, Mississippi Bo Weevil, Southbound, Tongue-Tied Jill.
 Gibson Bros., Who's Black And Who's Not? (Sympathy For The Record Industry) SFTRI 162. Vinyl recording. (1991) Songs: White Nigger; Minnie The Moocher.

Albums

 Gibson Bros., Build A Raft. (Old Age). Old Age 007. Vinyl recording. (1987) 
 Gibson Bros., Big Pine Boogie. (OKra Records) OK 33002. Vinyl recording. (1987)
 Gibson Bros., Big Pine Boogie. (Homestead Records) HMS 119–1. Vinyl recording. (1987) 
 Gibson Bros., Dedicated Fool. (Homestead Records) HMS 141–1. Vinyl recording. (1989)  Mehr
 Gibson Bros., The Man Who Loved Couch Dancing. (Homestead Records) HMS 163-1/2. Vinyl recording. (1990) 
 Gibson Bros., Memphis Sol Today! (Sympathy For The Record Industry) SFTRI 176. Vinyl recording. (1993) 
 Gibson Bros., Columbus Soul 85. (In The Red) ITR 034. Vinyl recording. (1996)

Compilations

 Various artists, A History Of Memphis Garage Rock: The '90s. (Shangri-La Records) Shangri-La 037. Vinyl recording. (2003) Song: Emulsified
 Various artists, Killed By The Blues. (P-Vine) PCD 5486. Vinyl recording. (1999) Songs: I'm Drifting; Mississippi Bo Weevil.
 Various artists, Love Is My Only Crime. (Intercord) IRS 964.966. Vinyl recording. (1993) Song: I Don't Wanna Forget How To Jive.
 Various artists, Root Damage. (Sympathy For The Record Industry) SFTRI 713. Vinyl recording. (2003) Song: Memphis Chicken.
 Various artists, Tard & Further'd: Siltbreeze Singles Compilation. (Siltbreeze Records) SB 52. Vinyl recording. Song: Broke Down Engine.
 Various artists, Their Sympathetic Majesties Request: Volume 1: A Decade Of Obscurity And Obsolescence, 1988–1998. (Sympathy For The Record Industry) SFTRI 200. Vinyl recording. (1998) Song: Barbara.

Gibson Bros. & Workdogs

Albums

 Gibson Bros. & Workdogs, Punk Rock Truck Driving Song Of A Gun. (Homestead Records) HMS 154–1. Vinyl recording. (1990)

Compilations

 Various artists, Brain Blo. (Casting Couch) CCR 009. Vinyl recording. (1992) Song: Not Fade Away.

Monsieur Jeffrey Evans & La Fong

Singles

 Monsieur Jeffrey Evans & La Fong, Music From Binghamton. (Sympathy For The Record Industry) SFTRI 101. Vinyl recording. (1990) Songs: Whistle Bait; Shake, Rattle And Roll.

Compilations

 Various artists, A History Of Memphis Garage Rock: The '90s. (Shangri-La Records) Shangri-La 037. Vinyl recording. (2003) Song: Shake, Rattle & Roll.
 Various artists, Their Sympathetic Majesties Request: Volume 1: A Decade Of Obscurity And Obsolescence, 1988–1998. (Sympathy For The Record Industry) SFTRI 200. Vinyl recording. (1998) Song: Shake, Rattle & Roll.

'68 Comeback

Singles

 '68 Comeback, 3 X Loser. (Sugar Ditch) SD 003. Vinyl recording. (1992) Songs: Three Times Loser; His Latest Flame.
 '68 Comeback, The Annex Sessions, Volume One. (Sympathy For The Record Industry) SFTRI 450. Vinyl recording. (1996) Songs: I Want My Mule Back; Painter Of Sadness.
 '68 Comeback, The Annex Sessions, Volume Two. (Sympathy For The Record Industry) SFTRI 451. Vinyl recording. (1997) Songs: Whistle Bait; Modern Don Juan.
 '68 Comeback, Do The Rub b/w Cadillac Man. (Bag Of Hammers) BOH 021. Vinyl recording. (1994)
 '68 Comeback, Flip, Flop & Fly b/w He's My Everything. (Get Hip) GH 168. Vinyl recording. (1994)
 '68 Comeback, Great Million Sellers "Rocks The Oldies." (1+2 Records) 1+2 EP 053. Vinyl recording. (1994) Songs: Willie & The Hand Jive; Sixteen Tons.
 '68 Comeback, High School Confidential b/w Boppin' High School Baby. (PCP Records) PCP 014. Vinyl recording. (1995)
 '68 Comeback, It Gets A Little Red b/w A Long Time Ago. (In The Red) ITR 016. Vinyl recording. (1993)
 '68 Comeback, Memphis. (Sympathy For The Record Industry) SFTRI 215. Vinyl recording. (1993) Songs: Chantilly Rock (And A Pony's Tail); All Night Long.
 '68 Comeback, Peepin' & Hidin' b/w Eager Boy. (Casting Couch) CCR 010. Vinyl recording. (1993)
 '68 Comeback, Someday My Prince Will Come. (Sympathy For The Record Industry) SFTRI 390. Vinyl recording. (1996) Songs: Someday My Prince Will Come; The Darker The Berry; Sticks And Stones; Bending Like A Willow Tree.
 '68 Comeback, Tobacco Road, Part I b/w Hedzaz. (Sympathy For The Record Industry) SFTRI 292. Vinyl recording. (1994)
 '68 Comeback, You Could Call Me Job b/w Where The Rio De Rosa Flows. (Subpop) SP 216. Vinyl recording. (1993)

Albums

 '68 Comeback, A Bridge Too Fuckin' Far. (Sympathy For The Record Industry) SFTRI 422. Vinyl recording. (1998) 
 '68 Comeback, Golden Rogues Collection. (Sympathy For The Record Industry) SFTRI 321. Vinyl recording. (1994) 
 '68 Comeback, Love Always Wins. (Sympathy For The Record Industry) SFTRI 574. Vinyl recording. (1999)
 '68 Comeback, Mr. Downchild. (Sympathy For The Record Industry) SFTRI 277. Vinyl recording. (1994) 
 '68 Comeback, Paper Boy Blues. (Sympathy For The Record Industry) SFTRI 258. Vinyl recording. (1993)

Compilations

 Various artists, A History Of Memphis Garage Rock: The '90s. (Shangri-La Records) Shangri-La 037. Vinyl recording. (2003) Song: Paper Boy Blues.
 Various artists, I Hate Music. (P-Vine) PCD 5489. Vinyl recording. (1999) Song: A Long Time Ago.
 Various artists, Killed By The Blues. (P-Vine) PCD 5486. Vinyl recording. (1999) Song: It Gets A Little Red.
 Various artists, PCP Generics. (PCP Records) PCP 022. Vinyl recording. (1995) Song: Boppin' High School Baby.
 Various artists, Root Damage. (Sympathy For The Record Industry) SFTRI 713. Vinyl recording. (2003) Song: '68.
 Various artists, Shine On, Sweet Starlet soundtrack. (Sympathy For The Record Industry) SFTRI 537. Vinyl recording. (1998) Song: Dick C. Belle.
 Various artists, The Sore Losers soundtrack. (Sympathy For The Record Industry) SFTRI 338. Vinyl recording. (1997) Songs: Funky Kuntry Capers; '68; Smack Dab (In The Middle); Go Go Goliatha.
 Various artists, Their Sympathetic Majesties Request: Volume 2. (Sympathy For The Record Industry) SFTRI 300. Vinyl recording. (2003) Song: Chantilly Rock.

Monsieur Jeffrey Evans & Ross Johnson

Compilations

 Ross Johnson, Make It Stop! The Most of Ross Johnson (Goner Records) 37 GONE. Vinyl recording. (2007) Song: Farmer John.
 Various artists, Happy Birthday, Baby Jesus. (Sympathy For The Record Industry) SFTRI 271. Vinyl recording. (1993) Song: Mr. Blue X-mas (Cut Your Head On Christmas).
 Various artists, Happy Birthday, Baby Jesus: Volumes 1 & 2. (Sympathy For The Record Industry) SFTRI 396. Vinyl recording. (1994) Song: Mr. Blue X-mas (Cut Your Head On Christmas).

Jeffrey Evans' CC Riders

Albums

 CC Riders, CC Riders. (Contaminated Records) Vinyl recording. (2001)

Monsieur Jeffrey Evans

Albums

 Monsieur Jeffrey Evans, I've Lived A Rich Life: Live at Shangri-La Records. (Sympathy For The Record Industry) SFTRI 650. Vinyl recording. (2002) 
 Walter Daniels, the Oblivians & Monsieur Jeffrey Evans, Melissa's Garage Revisited. (Sympathy for the Record Industry) SFTRI 590. Vinyl recording. (1999)

Compilations

 Various artists, Guitarrorists. (No. 6 Records / Caroline Records) KAR 009. Vinyl recording. (1991) Song: Longwood Mansion.
 Various artists, When the Levee Breaks: A Benefit Concert for Katrina Survivors. (Label 219 Records / Redeye Distribution) Vinyl recording. (2006)

Splits

 Monsieur Jeffrey Evans & Don Howland, Tour split. (db's Records) DBS 8. Vinyl recording. (2001) Song: Sweatshop Blues.

South Filthy

Singles

 South Filthy, Goin' Down The Valley b/w Carry That Load. (Beast Records) BR076. (2007)
 South Filthy, Soul Of A Man b/w Speed Traps, Weigh Stations, & Detour Signs. (Wrecked Em Records) Wrecked 004. Vinyl recording. (2003)

Albums

 South Filthy, Crackin' Up. (Licorice Tree Records) YUM 1008. Vinyl recording. (2006)
 South Filthy, Crackin' Up + You Can Name It Yo' Mammy If You Wanna. (Rockin' Bones) RON 062-1/RON062-2. Vinyl recording. (2005)
 South Filthy, You Can Name It Yo' Mammy If You Wanna. (Sympathy For The Record Industry) SFTRI 701. Vinyl recording. (2002)

Compilations

 Various artists, Root Damage (Sympathy For The Record Industry) SFTRI 713. Vinyl recording. (2003) Song: Hot Dog.

Documentary

 He is the subject of a documentary film, "The Man Who Loved Couch Dancing" directed by Ron Franklin, photographed by Inge Broere, and edited by Brandon Hutchinson. 

Other artists with whom he has worked

 Earl Poole Ball
 Scott Bomar
 Jeff Bouck
 Dan Brown
 Mike Buck
 Greg Cartwright
 Eugene Chadbourne
 Walter Daniels
 Will Dawson
 Nick Diablo
 Dan Dow
 Electric Company
 Ron Franklin
 Eric Friedl
 Kristof Hahn
 Barry Hayden
 Suzy Hendrix
 Ellen Hoover
 Don Howland
 Mike Hunt
 Scott Jarvis
 Tommy Jay
 Ross Johnson Mehr
 brad pounders
 Texacala Jones
 Rob Kennedy
 Stephanie Lang
 Rich Lillash
 Mike Mariconda
 Cristina Martinez
 James "Jimbo" Mathus
 Ed Miles
 Marty Moore
 Rice Moorehead
 Peggy O'Neil
 Jeff Pope
 Timothy Prudhomme
 Jay Reatard Mehr
 George Reyes
 Scott Rogers
 Bruce Saltmarsh
 John Schooley
 Jon Spencer Mehr
 Brendan Lee Spengler
 Brent Stokesberry
 Jack Taylor (1965–1997)
 Alicja Trout Mehr
 Matt Uhlmann
 "Blind" Lary Warner
 Darin Lin Wood
 Adam Woodard
 Jack Yarber

References

 Mehr, Bob. Memphis Commercial Appeal.'' Dedicated fool: Persistence proves its own reward for local cult legend.  December 15, 2006.

External links

  Grunnen Rocks
 Memphis Commercial Appeal.
 Austin Chronicle

Musicians from Tennessee
Living people
Year of birth missing (living people)
Homestead Records artists